The Florida version of the NWA Southern Tag Team Championship was a top tag team title in the National Wrestling Alliance's Florida territory, Championship Wrestling from Florida. It existed from 1960 until 1971, when the title was abandoned.

Title history

See also
Championship Wrestling from Florida
National Wrestling Alliance
NWA Southern Tag Team Championship (Official NWA-sanctioned version) 
NWA Southern Tag Team Championship (Mid-America version)

Footnotes

References

Wrestling-Titles.com

Championship Wrestling from Florida championships
National Wrestling Alliance championships
Tag team wrestling championships
Regional professional wrestling championships
Professional wrestling in Florida